WBCV(107.9 FM, "The Big Cheese") is a radio station  broadcasting an adult hits/classic hits/classic rock format. Licensed to Wausau, Wisconsin, United States, the station serves the Wausau-Stevens Point area.  The station is currently owned by NRG Media, LLC. Its 100,000 watt signal can be heard as far west as Eau Claire, as far south as Portage, and as far east as Brillion and Green Bay. It can also be heard as far north as Ironwood. Under certain conditions, it can be heard as far east as Manistee, Traverse City, and Ludington.

History
During the construction phase of the station (early 1980s), the selected call letters were WXCO-FM. The call letters were named after its sister station WXCO-AM. It was later determined the station would not be a simulcast of WXCO. Shortly before sign-on in October 1984, Seehafer Broadcasting changed the station call letters to WYCO-FM. The station signed on using Unistar's adult contemporary format. The positioning statement was "Y-108". At that time, WYCO-FM was only a satellite receiver and several cart/tape machines. The on-air announcer at WXCO would manually load commercials and local pre-recorded announcements for each local commercial break. Despite WYCO not having a live studio or a way to produce local programming on its own, "Y-108" became the #1 radio station in the Wausau market in 1985. It has not been #1 since.  Other positioning statements used were "The Great Y-108", and "Y-108 Come on Up To The Music".

The station had struggles with ratings and advertising revenue in the late 1980s. The automation system for WYCO-FM was moved to WXCO-AM, and the station went live. Adding the services of McVay Media in 1992, the station showed some potential in the Spring '93 book, but continued to struggle afterwards with live talent. In the mid-1990s, the station started to phase back in syndicated programming (adding Delilah, and using Jones Radio Networks' Hot AC format during the overnight and weekends). Advertising revenue and ratings were still a major problem for the station. The station made several attempts to find a niche identity to increase listeners and revenue. WYCO-FM experimented with variations of adult contemporary, Hot AC, Top 40 (CHR), and Modern AC formats, but had little success.

In 2004, management decided to take an entirely new direction. Adult hits stations like Jack FM and Bob FM were becoming the latest fad in radio formats. The station decided to take on different call letters and try a new developing format. The call letters became WLRK ("Rock-it 107.9"), "Rockin' Hits of the '70s, '80s, and '90s". The station had much better results. The station was sold from Seehafer Broadcasting to NRG Media in June 2006. "Rock-it 107.9" became "Big Cheese 107.9" and call letters were changed from WLRK to WBCV. The "Big Cheese" slogan and the adult hits/classic hits/classic rock format continues today.

References

External links

BCV
NRG Media radio stations